The 1926 Connecticut Aggies football team represented Connecticut Agricultural College, now the University of Connecticut, in the 1926 college football season as a member of the New England Conference.  The Aggies were led by fourth year head coach Sumner Dole, and completed the season with a record of 7–1, going 3–1 against conference opponents.

Schedule

References

Connecticut
UConn Huskies football seasons
Connecticut Aggies football